Plati may refer to:

 Platì, a village in Calabria, Italy
 , an uninhabited Dodecanese islet in the archipelago of Kalymnos, Greece
 Platy (fish), a freshwater fish
 Mark Plati, musician
 Plati, Evros, a village in Evros, Greece

See also
 Giovanni Benedetto Platti (1697?-1763), Italian Baroque composer and oboist
 Platy (disambiguation)